The Pirelli Richard Burns Foundation Rally (formerly the Pirelli International Rally) is a rallying race that takes place in North England since 1992. Based in the Kielder Forest complex near Carlisle, it features a mixture of fast open sprints across farmland and twisty forest tracks.

Features of the event

New Saturday / Sunday format
Saturday morning scrutineering option
More compact route than previous years
Option for Challengers to enter an event that will run on Sunday

Brief description
Using the infamous Kielder Forest complex, the event began in Carlisle town centre mid day on Saturday running into the evening, restarting on Sunday morning with a mid day finish at the Racecourse.

Winners

External links
RBF Pirelli Rally Official website
British Rally Championship Official website

British Rally Championship